Nawa Bazar is one of the administrative community development block of Palamu district, Jharkhand state, India.

See also
 Palamu Loksabha constituency
 Jharkhand Legislative Assembly
 Jharkhand
 Palamu

References
Blocks of Palamu district

Community development blocks in Jharkhand
Community development blocks in Palamu district